The white-browed antpitta (Hylopezus ochroleucus) is a species of bird in the family Grallariidae. It is endemic to Brazil. Its natural habitats are subtropical or tropical moist lowland forest and dry savanna. It is threatened by habitat loss.

References

white-browed antpitta
Birds of the Caatinga
Endemic birds of Brazil
white-browed antpitta
Taxonomy articles created by Polbot